Glass Mountain Ridge is a ridge located in Mono County, California.

The Glass Mountain Ridge forms the northeast boundary of Long Valley Caldera. It consists of a sequence of lava domes, flows, and welded pyroclastic flows of rhyolite composition that were erupted between 2.1 and 0.8 million years ago.

See also
 Glass Mountain

References

Landforms of Mono County, California
Ridges of California
Inyo National Forest